The Louis Fredrick House is a house designed by Frank Lloyd Wright at 19 W. County Line Road in Barrington, Illinois. The house was built in 1957 for Louis Fredrick, an affluent interior designer. The house's design is typical of Wright's later work, in which he adapted his Usonian design principles to larger homes for wealthier clients. Fredrick played a role in the design process as well, rejecting Wright's original plan on account of its concrete block walls and providing input on decisions such as coloring. The house's design includes a brick exterior, long horizontal window bands, a low roof covered with cedar shakes, and a large chimney.

The house was added to the National Register of Historic Places on January 12, 2016.

Also in 2016 the house was sold through auction to David and Joyce McArdle. The McArdles had previously owned and restored another Frank Lloyd Wright building, the F.B. Henderson House in Elmhurst, Illinois. After acquiring the home, the couple approached John Eifler, of Eifler & Associates, to restore the home, which included adding geothermal heating and cooling, and the construction of furniture that had originally been intended for the home. This restoration was complete by 2018.

References

 Storrer, William Allin. The Frank Lloyd Wright Companion. University Of Chicago Press, 2006,  (S.376)

National Register of Historic Places in Lake County, Illinois
Houses on the National Register of Historic Places in Illinois
Frank Lloyd Wright buildings
Houses completed in 1957
Barrington, Illinois